King Paul Akpan Udoh (born 5 September 1997) is an Italian association footballer who plays as a forward for  club Cesena.

Club career
Having started his career with Reggiana, Udoh moved to Juventus in 2011, and was immediately loaned back for a year. After progressing through the youth ranks of Juventus, Udoh secured a loan move to Serie B side Virtus Lanciano in 2016, with an option to buy at the end of the season. Failing to impress, he was returned to Juve, and then loaned to Lega Pro side Pontedera later the same year.

On 14 July 2019, he signed with Pianese.

On 13 September 2020 he joined Olbia on a 2-year contract.

On 26 August 2022, Udoh signed a three-year deal with Cesena.

Coronavirus infection 
On 27 February 2020, Udoh became the first professional footballer to be infected by the virus in Italy. According to the publications Udoh was put under quarantine after showing symptoms of the virus.

Personal life
Born in Italy, Udoh is of Nigerian descent. On 27 February 2020, Udoh became the first professional footballer to be diagnosed with the COVID-19.

References

External links
 
 

1997 births
Living people
Sportspeople from Reggio Emilia
Italian people of Nigerian descent
Italian sportspeople of African descent
Italian footballers
Association football forwards
Serie C players
Serie D players
A.C. Reggiana 1919 players
Juventus F.C. players
S.S. Virtus Lanciano 1924 players
U.S. Città di Pontedera players
Fermana F.C. players
Alma Juventus Fano 1906 players
F.C. Esperia Viareggio players
U.S. Pianese players
Olbia Calcio 1905 players
Cesena F.C. players
Footballers from Emilia-Romagna